David L. Hunke is the chairman of USA Today. He served as the company's publisher since April 2009.

References

Year of birth missing (living people)
Living people
USA Today people
American chairpersons of corporations
American newspaper publishers (people)